Karube (written: 苅部 or 軽部) is a Japanese surname. Notable people with the surname include:

Hiroshi Karube, Japanese Paralympic swimmer
, Japanese manga artist
, Japanese footballer
, Japanese footballer
, Japanese hurdler and sprinter

Japanese-language surnames